A sex museum is a museum that displays erotic art, historical sexual aids, and documents on the history of erotica. They were popular in Europe at the end of the 1960s and during the 1970s, the era of the sexual revolution.
Since the 1990s, these museums are often called erotic museums or erotic art museums instead of sex museums.

Asia

The first sex museum in China opened in 1999 in the center of Shanghai; in 2001 it moved to the outskirts of the city. It was variously called "Museum of Ancient Chinese Sex Culture" or "Dalin Cultural Exhibition" after its founder, sexologist Dr. Liu Dalin. In early 2004 it moved again, to Tong Li, and is now known as the China Sex Museum, with over three thousand erotic artifacts.
India's first sex museum opened in Mumbai (Bombay) in 2002.
South Korea's first sex museum, Asia Eros Museum, opened in the Insadong neighborhood in Seoul in 2003. The museum has since closed. After a five-year legal battle, private collector Kim Whan Bae opened the Museum of Sex and Health in Seogwipo, Jeju Island, in March 2006. 
Love Land Park on Jeju Island, South Korea, opened in 2004. It is an outdoor sculpture park focused on a theme of sex, running sex education films, and featuring 140 sculptures representing humans in various sexual positions.
In Japan, there are many sex museums called "Hihokan (House of Hidden Treasures)" everywhere across the country. They are located in amusement centers in popular sightseeing spots or spa resorts, and usually run by individuals, not by organizations. They date back to the 1960s–70s; more recently such  amusement resorts for older men have declined, and most sex museums closed in the 1990s-2000s.

Australia
The small National Museum of Erotica in Canberra opened in 2001. The museum closed soon after, although the collection continued to grow.

Europe 
Sexmuseum Amsterdam opened in 1985.
The Museum of Eroticism in Paris opened in 1997 and closed in 2016.
The Erotic Art Museum near the Reeperbahn in Hamburg opened in 1992.
 The Beate Uhse Erotic Museum in Berlin opened in 1996 and closed in 2014. It claimed to be "the world's largest erotic museum".
 The Museum Erotica in Copenhagen opened in 1993. It was closed in 2009 due to financial problems.
 The Museo de la Erotica in Barcelona opened in 1996.
 The first Russian sex museum opened in 2004 in Saint Petersburg; it claims to exhibit the preserved penis of Rasputin.
 While not specifically a sex museum, the National Archaeological Museum in Naples opened its extensive collection of historic erotic art in its Secret Cabinet to the public in 2000. Most of the exhibits are from Greek and Roman times, and many were recovered from nearby Pompeii.
 The Museo d'Arte Erotica, devoted to the erotic history of Venice and showing historical and contemporary erotic art opened in Venice, Italy, in February 2006.
 The Secretum or Cupboard 55, containing erotic objects at the British Museum, London.
 The Sex Machines Museum in Prague, Czech Republic, contains "an exposition of mechanical erotic appliances, the purpose of which is to bring pleasure and allow extraordinary and unusual positions during intercourse." On display in the museum are "more than 200 objects and mechanical appliances on view, a gallery of art with erotic themes, a cinema with old erotic films, erotic clothing and many other things pertaining to human sexuality.
 The first erotic museum in Lithuania opened in Kaunas on 13 July 2009.
Athens's first sex museum, "Kama Sutra: the World Museum of Erotic Art", opened in the Omonoia center at 44 Kapodistriou Street in 2012.
Moscow's first sex museum, named "Tochka G" ('G Spot') opened in 2011.
The Erotic Museum in Warsaw, the first sex museum in Poland, opened in 2011 with over 2,000 exhibits. It reveals the erotic fascinations of artists from all continents. The museum closed at the beginning of 2012 as they searched for a new location and more funds to keep the museum afloat.
Budapest's Erotic&Sex Museum opened in 2019 with a sex-art gallery and BDSM equipment exhibition.
Museum of Sexual Cultures, Kharkiv, opened in 1999.

North America 
 The Leather Archives and Museum in Chicago was founded in 1991 by Chuck Renslow and Tony DeBlase as a "community archives, library, and museum of Leather, kink, fetish, and BDSM history and culture."
 The Museum of Sex in New York City opened in 2002.
 The Hollywood Erotic Museum in Hollywood opened in January 2004. This museum is currently closed and now contains a Frederick's of Hollywood retail shop.
The World Erotic Art Museum in Miami Beach opened on October 16, 2005.
The Erotic Heritage Museum in Las Vegas opened on August 3, 2008. It claims to be the "world’s largest erotic museum at 24,000 sq. ft."
The Julia C. Bulette Cafe, Saloon, and Red Light Museum in Virginia City, Nevada was a small museum attached to a restaurant in the Comstock Lode boomtown. It is named for Julia Bulette, a local madam who was murdered. It closed in 2020.

South America 
 Museu do Sexo Hilda Furacão opened in Belo Horizonte, Minas Gerais, Brazil in 2016.

See also 
History of erotic depictions
Icelandic Phallological Museum

References

External links
Erotic Heritage Museum in Las Vegas
Museu arte erótica de Coimbra Portugal

 
Sex museums
Sex museums
Sexuality-related lists